"You Can Get It All" is the first official single off Bow Wow's seventh album, New Jack City II. It features Johntá Austin and contains an intro from Jermaine Dupri. The song samples the TLC song "Baby-Baby-Baby".

Music video
A music video for "You Can Get It All" has been made. It was produced by Jermaine Dupri and was shot in Malibu, California. It features Johntá Austin. The video was directed by Hype Williams.

Charts

References

External links
Billboard.com

2009 singles
Bow Wow (rapper) songs
Music videos directed by Hype Williams
Songs written by Bow Wow (rapper)
Columbia Records singles
2009 songs
Songs written by Babyface (musician)
Songs written by L.A. Reid
Songs written by Daryl Simmons
Songs written by Omarion